Nudiantennarius subteres, the deep-water frogfish, is a species of frogfish found in the Pacific Ocean around the Philippines and Indonesia. This species grows to a length of  SL. The species is monotypic, the only one in its genus. It is characterized as having naked skin with dermal spinules partially covering the head between the second and third dorsal spine; without a posterior membrane connected with the head.

References
 

 Pietsch, T. W., & Arnold, R. J. (2017). The “Lembeh Frogfish” Identified: Redescription of Nudiantennarius subteres (Smith and Radcliffe, in Radcliffe, 1912) (Teleostei: Lophiiformes: Antennariidae). Copeia, 105(4), 657–663. https://doi.org/10.1643/CI-17-651
 
 Pietsch, T. W. (1984). The Genera of Frogfishes (Family Antennariidae). Copeia, 1984(1), 27–44. https://doi.org/10.2307/1445032

 Pietsch, T. W., & Arnold, R. J. (2020). Frogfishes: Biodiversity, zoogeography, and behavioral ecology. Johns Hopkins University Press. 

Antennariidae
Fish described in 1912
Taxa named by Hugh McCormick Smith
Taxa named by Lewis Radcliffe